There are currently about 65 species of mammals in Singapore. Since the founding of modern Singapore in 1819, over 90 species have been recorded, including large species such as tigers, leopards and sambar deer. Most of these have since become extirpated from Singapore largely due to rapid urban development, with occasional large mammals such as Asian elephants swimming across the Straits of Johor from Johor, Malaysia.

Many surviving species have critically low population numbers, the most seriously endangered being the cream-coloured giant squirrel, last sighted in 1995 and now possibly extirpated. The Raffles' banded langur is also down to around 60 individuals. However, some species have been rediscovered in more remote parts of the country, such as the Malaysian porcupine which was found on Pulau Tekong in 2005, and the greater mousedeer on Pulau Ubin in 2009.

The most commonly seen native mammals are the long-tailed macaque and plantain squirrel. The largest terrestrial mammal that can still be found is the wild boar, which is common on the offshore islands of Pulau Ubin and Pulau Tekong, but also found on the mainland. The largest mammals in Singapore, however, are marine creatures such as dugongs and dolphins. The colugo is also doing well, but these are rarely seen due to their elusiveness and camouflage.

Order Artiodactyla (even-toed ungulates) 
Family Suidae (pigs)
Bornean bearded pig (Sus barbatus) (extirpated; no historical records but likely formerly present due to records from Johor and Riau Islands, and ability to reach islands by swimming) 
Wild boar (Sus scrofa) – Tuas, Jurong, Western Catchment, Lim Chu Kang, Kranji, Choa Chu Kang, Bukit Panjang, Bukit Batok, Bukit Timah, Central Catchment, Seletar, Sengkang, Punggol, Coney Island, Lorong Halus, Pasir Ris, Changi, Pulau Ubin, Pulau Tekong 

Family Cervidae (deer)
Sambar (Rusa unicolor) – Bukit Brown, Central Catchment (possibly extirpated, then re-established through escapees from captivity) 
Southern red muntjac (Muntiacus muntjak) – Central Catchment (possibly extirpated, recent sightings may be escapees from captivity), Pulau Tekong (unverified sighting) 

Family Tragulidae (mousedeer)
Lesser mousedeer (Tragulus kanchil) – Central Catchment 
Greater mousedeer (Tragulus napu) – Pulau Ubin, Western Catchment

Order Carnivora (carnivores) 
Family Herpestidae (mongooses)
Short-tailed mongoose (Urva brachyura) (historical record is based on a specimen that is likely to have been an escapee) 

Family Viverridae (civets)
Binturong (Arctictis binturong) (extirpated) 
Three-striped palm civet (Arctogalidia trivirgata) - Bukit Timah, Central Catchment 
Otter civet (Cynogale bennettii) (doubtful - based on old specimen without precise collection data) 
Masked palm civet (Paguma larvata) (indeterminate) - Central Catchment (possible escapee), Pulau Tekong (unverified sightings), Adam Road (roadkill in 2021) 
Sumatran palm civet (Paradoxurus musangus) - widespread across mainland Singapore in forests, woodlands, parks, and urban areas with trees, Pulau Ubin 
Large-spotted civet (Viverra megaspila) (doubtful, historical record likely based on misidentified Malay civet) 
Malay civet (Viverra tangalunga) - Central Catchment, possibly Pulau Tekong but has been confused with Large Indian civet 
Large Indian civet (Viverra zibetha) (indeterminate) - Jalan Bahar, possibly Pulau Tekong but has been confused with Malay civet, unverified sightings from Central Catchment 
Small Indian civet (Viverricula indica) (doubtful) 

Family Mustelidae (weasels, otters and relatives)
Small-clawed otter (Aonyx cinereus) – Pulau Ubin, Pulau Tekong, sightings of lone individuals in mainland Singapore might be escapees from captivity 
Smooth-coated otter (Lutrogale perspicillata) - mangroves and coasts, rivers, canals, reservoirs, and lakes in many locations on mainland Singapore, also often seen travelling overland or hunting in ornamental fish ponds, Pulau Ubin, Sentosa, St. John's Island, Pulau Semakau 
Hairy-nosed otter (Lutra sumatrana) (extirpated) 

Family Felidae (cats)
Leopard cat (Prionailurus bengalensis) – Pulau Ubin, Pulau Tekong, Western Catchment, Central Catchment, Sungei Buloh 
Flat-headed cat (Prionailurus planiceps) (doubtful - based on single specimen from former Raffles Museum collection that has since been lost) 
Sunda clouded leopard (Neofelis diardii) (doubtful - based on single specimen claimed to have been killed in Changi in 1898) 
Tiger (Panthera tigris) (extirpated) 
Leopard (Panthera pardus) (extirpated, unverified sightings on Pulau Tekong in 1980s) 
Family Canidae (dogs, wolves, and relatives)

 Dhole (Cuon alpinus) (extirpated) 

Family Ursidae (bears)
Sun bear (Helarctos malayanus) (extirpated; unverified sightings on Pulau Tekong in 1980s)

Order Cetacea (cetaceans) 
Family Delphinidae (marine dolphins)
Long-beaked common dolphin (Delphinus capensis) 
Irrawaddy dolphin (Orcaella brevirostris) – Singapore Strait 
False killer whale (Pseudorca crassidens) (vagrant) – Tuas 
Indo-Pacific humpback dolphin (Sousa chinensis) – Straits of Johor, Singapore Strait 
Indo-Pacific bottlenose dolphin (Tursiops aduncus) – Singapore Strait 

Family Phocoenidae (porpoises)
Finless porpoise (Neophocaena phocaenoides) – Singapore Strait 

Family Physeteridae (sperm whale)
Sperm whale (Physeter macrocephalus) (lone carcass in 2015) – Singapore Strait

Order Chiroptera (bats) 
Family Pteropodidae (Old World fruit bats)
Lesser dog-faced fruit bat (Cynopterus brachyotis) - common and widespread 
Cave nectar bat (Eonycteris spelaea) - common and widespread  
Common long-tongued fruit bat (Macroglossus minimus) - Sungei Buloh, Pulau Ubin, Pulau Tekong 
Dusky fruit bat (Penthetor lucasi) – Bukit Timah 
Malayan flying fox (Pteropus vampyrus) (visitor, former resident) - Central Catchment 
Geoffroy's rousette (Rousettus amplexicaudatus) (indeterminate, possibly extirpated) 

Family Emballonuridae (sheath-tailed bats)
Lesser sheath-tailed bat (Emballonura monticola) – Bukit Timah, Pulau Ubin 
Pouched tomb bat (Saccolaimus saccolaimus)  
Long-winged tomb bat (Taphozous longimanus) – Pulau Ubin 
Black-bearded tomb bat (Taphozous melanopogon)  

Family Nycteridae (hollow-faced bats)
Southeast Asian hollow-faced bat (Nycteris tragata) – Central Catchment 

Family Megadermatidae (false vampires)
Lesser false vampire (Megaderma spasma) – Pulau Ubin, Pulau Tekong 

Family Rhinolophidae (horseshoe bats)
Glossy horseshoe bat (Rhinolophus lepidus) – Bukit Timah, Central Catchment 
Woolly horseshoe bat (Rhinolophus luctus) - Central Catchment, Changi 
Lesser woolly horseshoe bat (Rhinolophus sedulus) (indeterminate, possibly extirpated) 
Lesser brown horseshoe bat (Rhinolophus stheno) (indeterminate, possibly extirpated) 
Trefoil horseshoe bat (Rhinolophus trifoliatus) – Central Catchment, Pulau Tekong 

Family Hipposideridae (Old World leaf-nosed bats)
Bicolored roundleaf bat (Hipposideros bicolor) – Bukit Timah 
Fawn roundleaf bat (Hipposideros cervinus) (indeterminate, possibly extirpated) 
Ashy roundleaf bat (Hipposideros cineraceus) – Pulau Ubin 
Ridley's roundleaf bat (Hipposideros ridleyi) (indeterminate, possibly extirpated) 

Family Vespertilionidae (evening bats)
Big-eared pipistrelle (Hypsugo macrotis) – Pulau Ubin 
Hardwicke's woolly bat (Kerivoula hardwickii) – Central Catchment, Pulau Tekong 
Brown tube-nosed bat (Murina suilla) – Pulau Tekong 
Lesser large-footed myotis (Myotis hasseltii) 
Horsfield's large-footed myotis (Myotis horsfieldii) – Central Catchment 
Whiskered myotis (Myotis muricola) - widespread 
Singapore whiskered bat (Myotis oreias) – endemic to Singapore, possibly globally extinct, but might not actually exist 
Javan pipistrelle (Pipistrellus javanicus) – widespread, recent records from Ayer Rajah, Paya Lebar, Punggol, Upper Thomson, Kent Ridge 
Narrow-winged pipistrelle (Pipistrellus stenopterus) – Singapore Botanic Gardens, Holland Village, Rochester Park, most recent record from Bukit Timah 
Asiatic lesser yellow bat (Scotophilus kuhlii) - common and widespread 
Lesser bamboo bat (Tylonycteris pachypus) – Bukit Timah 
Greater bamboo bat (Tylonycteris robustula) - widespread 

Family Molossidae (free-tailed bats)
Naked bulldog bat (Cheiromeles torquatus) – Bukit Timah, Central Catchment, Sembawang 
Wrinkle-lipped free-tailed bat (Chaerephon plicatus) (indeterminate, possibly extirpated)

Order Dermoptera (colugo) 
Family Cynocephalidae (colugo)
Malayan colugo or Malayan flying lemur (Galeopterus variegatus) – Bukit Timah, Bukit Batok, Central Catchment, Bukit Brown, Gallop Road, Portsdown, Changi

Order Eulipotyphla (insectivores) 
Family Soricidae (shrews)
House shrew (Suncus murinus) – urban 
Malayan shrew (Crocidura malayana) – Bukit Timah, Central Catchment 

Family Erinaceidae (hedgehogs and gymnures)
Moonrat (Echinosorex gymnura) (doubtful - based on single specimen from former Raffles Museum collection that has since been lost)

Order Perissodactyla (odd-toed ungulates) 
Family Tapiridae (tapirs)
Malayan tapir (Tapirus indicus) (visitor) – Pulau Ubin, Changi

Order Pholidota (pangolins) 
Family Manidae (pangolins)
Sunda pangolin (Manis javanica) – Bukit Timah, Bukit Batok, Bukit Panjang, Central Catchment, Pulau Ubin, Pulau Tekong, Western Catchment, Labrador, may wander into built-up areas

Order Primates (primates) 
Family Lorisidae (lorises)
Sunda slow loris (Nycticebus coucang) – Bukit Timah, Central Catchment, Pulau Tekong 

Family Cercopithecidae (Old World monkeys)
Long-tailed macaque (Macaca fascicularis) – Bukit Timah, Central Catchment, Sungei Buloh, Western Catchment, Bukit Batok, Woodlands Waterfront, Admiralty Park, Punggol, Coney Island, Pulau Ubin, Pulau Tekong, Sentosa, Sisters Islands, lone individuals and small groups occasionally seen in parks and urban areas elsewhere in Singapore 
Southern pig-tailed macaque (Macaca nemestrina) (doubtful, historical records in Singapore are likely to be based on escapees from captivity) Tengeh Reservoir (individual seen in 2020) 
Raffles' banded langur (Presbytis femoralis) – around 60 left in Central Catchment, Upper Thomson 
Dusky langur (Trachypithecus obscurus) - Central Catchment (colonisation in 2019 with the appearance of a trio which likely originated from Johor), Kent Ridge (likely escapee in 2008)

Order Proboscidea (elephants) 
Family Elephantidae (elephants)
Asian elephant (Elephas maximus)  (visitor) – Pulau Tekong (1990), Pulau Ubin (1991)

Order Rodentia (rodents) 
Family Muridae (mice and rats)
Asian house mouse (Mus musculus) – urban 
Norway rat (Rattus norvegicus) (introduced) – urban 
Asian house rat (Rattus tanezumi) – urban, forest edge 
Polynesian rat (Rattus exulans) - urban, forest edge 
Malaysian wood rat (Rattus tiomanicus)  
Brown spiny rat (Maxomys rajah) – Central Catchment 
Red spiny rat (Maxomys surifer) (extirpated) – formerly recorded in Bukit Timah 
Annandale's rat (Sundamys annandalei) – Bukit Timah, Central Catchment, Pulau Ubin 

Family Spalacidae (mole-rats)
Large bamboo rat (Rhizomys sumatrensis) (doubtful, historical records are likely escapees) 

Family Sciuridae (squirrels)
Finlayson's or variable squirrel (Callosciurus finlaysonii) (introduced) – Bidadari, Woodleigh 
Plantain squirrel (Callosciurus notatus) – widespread and common on mainland, Sentosa, Pulau Tekong, Pulau Ubin, Pulau Semakau 
Prevost's squirrel (Callosciurus prevostii) (doubtful) 
Three-striped ground squirrel (Lariscus insignis) (extirpated) 
Slender squirrel (Sundasciurus tenuis) – Bukit Timah, Bukit Batok, Central Catchment, Singapore Botanic Gardens 
Cream-coloured giant squirrel (Ratufa affinis) (likely extirpated) – formerly recorded in Bukit Timah, Central Catchment 
Shrew-faced ground squirrel (Rhinosciurus laticaudatus) – Bukit Timah, Central Catchment 
Red-cheeked flying squirrel (Hylopetes spadiceus) – Bukit Timah, Central Catchment  
Horsfield's flying squirrel (Iomys horsfieldii) – Bukit Batok, Bukit Timah, Central Catchment 
Red giant flying squirrel (Petaurista petaurista) (likely extirpated) 

Family Hystricidae (Old World porcupines)
Malayan porcupine (Hystrix brachyura) – Pulau Tekong, Pulau Ubin, Bukit Timah, Central Catchment, Western Catchment

Order Scandentia (treeshrews) 
Family Tupaiidae (treeshrews)
Common treeshrew (Tupaia glis) – Bukit Timah, Central Catchment, Singapore Botanic Gardens, Portsdown, Bidadari, Bedok, Bukit Batok, Jurong Hill, Kent Ridge, Sungei Buloh, Western Catchment, Pulau Ubin

Order Sirenia (sea cows) 
Family Dugongidae (dugong)
Dugong (Dugong dugon) – Straits of Johor, Singapore Strait 

Note: "extirpated" means locally extinct in Singapore.

See also
List of birds of Singapore
List of reptiles of Singapore
List of amphibians of Singapore

References

.
Mammals
Singapore
 Singapore
Singapore